Zhang Aiping (January 9, 1910, in Da County, Sichuan – July 5, 2003, in Beijing) was a Chinese military leader.

Biography

Zhang joined the Communist Party of China in 1928 after taking part in a communist-led rural uprising. He participated in the Long March and served as a field commander in the Chinese Red Army, first fighting against Chiang Kai-shek's Kuomintang forces, and later the Imperial Japanese Army in the Second Sino-Japanese War. During World War II Zhang commanded a guerrilla band sent to rescue U.S. flight crews who crash landed in China following the April 1942 Tokyo bombing raid led by Lieutenant Colonel Jimmy Doolittle. 

After 1949, Zhang was an important builder of the Chinese military forces. He commanded the first People's Liberation Army naval force and served as an army corps commander in the Korean War. Upon his return home he served in a series of significant military and political posts. He was made a General in 1955.

Zhang was accused of counterrevolutionary crimes and dismissed from all positions during the Cultural Revolution, when many veteran communists were attacked by Red Guards inspired by Mao Zedong's vision of continuous revolution, and one of his legs was broken as a result. Later, Zhang would comment: "The only thing the Cultural Revolution succeeded in was giving me a cane." He reappeared in 1973 and served as defense minister from 1982 until 1988. He served as deputy chief of the PLA general staff, vice premier, and chaired a key commission that sought to modernize the PLA.

During the Tiananmen Square protests of 1989, Zhang Aiping signed a letter opposing the enforcement of martial law by the Army in Beijing.

Zhang Aiping died in Beijing at the age of 93.

See also
List of officers of the People's Liberation Army

References 

1910 births
2003 deaths
Ministers of National Defense of the People's Republic of China
Chinese military personnel of World War II
People's Liberation Army generals from Sichuan
Politicians from Dazhou
Chinese Communist Party politicians from Sichuan
People's Republic of China politicians from Sichuan
Victims of the Cultural Revolution
State councillors of China
Burials at Babaoshan Revolutionary Cemetery